The 1936 Swiss Grand Prix was a Grand Prix motor race held at Bremgarten on 23 August 1936.

Classification

References

Swiss Grand Prix
Swiss Grand Prix
Grand Prix